Ižkovce (1297 Iske, 1427 Izke) is a village and municipality in Michalovce District in the Košice Region of eastern Slovakia.

History
In historical records the village was first mentioned in 1297 when it was a feud of Čičarovce. From 1938 to 1944 it belonged to Hungary.

Geography
The village lies at an altitude of 102 metres and covers an area of  (2020-06-30/-07-01).

Genealogical resources

The records for genealogical research are available at the state archive "Statny Archiv in Presov, Slovakia"

 Roman Catholic church records (births/marriages/deaths): 1781-1876 (parish B)
 Greek Catholic church records (births/marriages/deaths): 1789-1886 (parish B)

See also
 List of municipalities and towns in Slovakia

References

External links

https://web.archive.org/web/20071027094149/http://www.statistics.sk/mosmis/eng/run.html
Surnames of living people in Izkovce

Villages and municipalities in Michalovce District